Aïmen Moueffek (born 9 April 2001) is a French professional footballer who plays as a right-back for the  club Saint-Étienne.

Club career 
Born in Vienne, Isère, Moueffek first played in the Amicale Laïque de Saint-Maurice-L'Exil. He later joined the Cascol club from Oullins, before arriving in Saint-Étienne during the 2011–12 season.

After winning the Coupe Gambardella in 2019, he signed his first professional contract in July 2019.

After some successful performances in the 2020 summer friendlies, Moueffek made his professional debut for Saint-Étienne on the 17 September 2020.

International career
Born in France, Moueffek is of Moroccan descent. He is a youth international for France.

References

External links
 
 
 

2001 births
Living people
Sportspeople from Vienne, Isère
French footballers
French sportspeople of Moroccan descent
France youth international footballers
Association football fullbacks
AS Saint-Étienne players
Ligue 1 players
Ligue 2 players
Championnat National 2 players
Footballers from Auvergne-Rhône-Alpes